The United States Geospatial Intelligence Foundation (USGIF) is a 501(c)(3) non-profit educational foundation in Virginia dedicated to promoting the geospatial intelligence tradecraft and developing a stronger GEOINT Community with government, industry, academia, professional organizations, and individuals who develop and apply geospatial intelligence to address national security challenges. USGIF achieves its mission through various programs and events and by building the community, advancing the tradecraft, and accelerating innovation. USGIF provides a number of programs and events such as its GEOINT Symposium, an academic accreditation program for college and university geospatial programs, and other live, virtual, and hybrid programs to provide the community with the opportunity to collaborate with senior-level officials across the multiple communities and support the future of the tradecraft.

History 
The United States Geospatial Intelligence Foundation was created in January 2004 by a group of tradecraft professionals recognizing the need for a forum where they could work together——outside their own organizational and corporate interests——toward a mutual goal of improving national and homeland security. The idea for the Foundation started with an event, Geo-Intel 2003, which drew enough interest to solidify the group’s notion that the tradecraft community needed a forum. This event drew more than 1,000 intelligence professionals. Just months later, USGIF was created, publicly announcing its launch on May 12, 2004.

Organization

Structure 

The United States Geospatial Intelligence Foundation (USGIF) is a Virginia-based nonstock, nonlobbyist, not-for-profit 501(c)(3) corporation. The business and affairs of the Foundation are managed by a Board of Directors which oversees the Foundation through the work of three standing Board committees:  Finance and Audit, Management and Compensation, and Nominating and Corporate Governance.  

USGIF builds its constituency through memberships at the individual and corporate level. Individuals can join the Foundation as members from academia (faculty and students), law enforcement and first responders, U.S. or foreign government or military members, young professionals, association/not-for-profit/non-governmental organization members, members of the press/media, and members from U.S. or foreign industry. Individuals may also join as lifetime members. Organizations can join USGIF at different tiers of partnership: strategic, associate, sustaining, academic, and small business.

Working groups and committees 
Much of the business of the Foundation is accomplished through its non-Board committees and working groups composed of members of the Foundation. The two non-Board committees are the Planning Committee, which helps plan Foundation events and programs, and the Academic Committee which provides academic outreach to universities and colleges as well as promoting the aims of USGIF in government and industry. USGIF also has ten working groups that serve as topically-oriented communities of interest:
 Building Respect, Inclusion, and Diversity for the GEOINT Enterprise (BRIDGE)
 Commercial GEOINT Working Group (CGWG)
 Machine Learning and Artificial Intelligence Working Group (MLAIWG)
 Modeling, Simulation, and Gaming Working Group (MSGWG)
 NGA Advisory Working Group (NAWG)
 NRO Industry Advisory Working Group (NIAWG)
 Small Business Advisory Working Group (SBAWG)
 St. Louis Area Working Group (SLAWG)
 Tradecraft and Professional Development Working Group (TPDWG)
 Young Professionals Working Group (YPWG)

Events

GEOINT Symposium 

Carrying the torch of Geo-Intel 2003 as an official organization, USGIF rebranded the event as GEOINT Symposium. In November 2004, USGIF held the first GEOINT Symposium in New Orleans and attracted more than 1,500 participants. The annual event is typically held in the spring and has since been hosted in San Antonio, Texas; Orlando, Florida; Nashville, Tennessee; Tampa, Florida; Washington, DC; St. Louis, Missouri; and Denver, Colorado. Typically the event draws more than 3500 attendees, including speakers and exhibitors. The Symposium was not held in 2013 due to a government shutdown and was postponed instead to 2014, and it was cancelled in 2020 due to the global pandemic. 

The GEOINT Symposium was described in 2008 by Tim Shorrock as "one of the few open windows into the thinking at the highest levels of US intelligence", as it "has become the nation's showcase for intelligence contractors and agencies alike...". In his book Spies for Hire: The Secret World of Intelligence Outsourcing, Shorrock recounts several notable events at GEOINT Symposiums. Among them, in 2004, the Symposium featured the directors of the CIA, the NSA, and the NGA speaking at a public session at the same time—the only occasion during the presidency of George W. Bush when such a public collective gathering would occur. He also notes that, in 2005, Deputy Director of National Intelligence for Collection Mary Margaret Graham inadvertently revealed the amount of money spent by the US government on national intelligence, the first time the budget amount had been revealed since 1998.

In 2006, the GEOINT Symposium featured then Director of National Intelligence John D. Negroponte as keynote speaker. In 2008, the address was delivered by Negroponte's successor, Mike McConnell, whose speech was picked up by multiple media outlets. As the then Director of National Intelligence, James Clapper provided keynote remarks at every GEOINT Symposium between 2011 and 2016, and also keynoted in 2010 as the Under Secretary of Defense for Intelligence.  Other Undersecretaries of Defense for Intelligence have spoken at the Symposium, including Michael G. Vickers in 2011 and 2012, Marcel Lettre in 2015 and 2016, and Joseph D. Kernan in 2018. In 2018 and 2019, former Principal Deputy Director of National Intelligence Susan M. Gordon spoke at the Symposium, and in 2021 Dr. Stacey Dixon keynoted. The GEOINT stage also provides a forum for an annual public address by the Director of the National Geospatial-Intelligence Agency, and has often included speeches by directors of other intelligence agencies. The GEOINT stage has drawn additional contributors, among them Donald Kerr, General James Cartwright, Lt. Gen. William G. Boykin, Lt. Gen. Russel L. Honoré, Dr. Christopher K. Tucker, retired Gen. Anthony Zinni, Charles E. Allen, Ambassador Dennis Richardson, Anthony Tether, Al Munson, Bran Ferren, Gen. Michael Hayden, Suzette Kimball, Gen. Stanley A. McChrystal, Gen. Charles Q. Brown Jr., Robert D. Kaplan, and Dr. Lisa Porter.

Tech Days 
Tech Days has been an event at which USGIF Members showcased their technologies without having to compete against speakers or an agenda. This event was held each spring in the D.C. metro area to allow members of US Congress and other government employees convenient access to the latest developments and solutions in geospatial technology. Tech Days was produced in cooperation with the National Geospatial-Intelligence Agency (NGA), which hosted a classified technology component as part of the event. Tech Days culminated with the GEOGala black-tie dinner.

Chairman’s Event 
In addition to the USGIF Speaker Series, USGIF hosts smaller dinner events where USGIF Strategic Partner Members can listen to and speak with leaders in Government, Defense, Intelligence, Academia, and Industry in a more intimate and casual environment. The event, at times, coincides with a classified briefing or other relevant activities. The Chairman’s Events are open only to Strategic Partner Members, USGIF Board of Directors, and select invited guests.

Supporting education 
USGIF supports education through several programs. It is the only body accrediting university programs in geospatial intelligence a sub-field of geographic information science, under its Geospatial Intelligence Certificate Program. The first four universities accredited were University of Missouri, Pennsylvania State University, George Mason University and the University of Texas at Dallas. The program was launched after several years of planning and community outreach to draft an acceptable set of standards. There are currently 19 colleges and universities with USGIF accredited GEOINT programs. 

USGIF also provides scholarships to college and university students in geospatial-related fields as well as to high school students intending higher education in geospatial-related fields and hosts the USGIF James and Susan Clapper Education Initiative Fund to fund earth-science material for primary and secondary students.

Notes

Sources

External links
Official site
, Military Geospatial Technology

Foundations based in the United States
Geospatial intelligence organizations
Geographic data and information organizations in the United States